Balmazújvárosi Kézilabda Klub  is a Hungarian handball club from Balmazújváros, that played in the  Nemzeti Bajnokság I, the top level championship in Hungary.

Crest, colours, supporters

Naming history

Kit manufacturers and Shirt sponsor
The following table shows in detail Balmazújvárosi Kézilabda Klub kit manufacturers and shirt sponsors by year:

Kits

Team

Current squad
Squad for the 2015–16 season

Goalkeepers
 13  László Pajkó
 55  Teodor Paul
   István Bagi

Wingers
 18  Mateo Dioris
 20  Ákos Balda
 34  Imre Veres
 66  Marinko Kekezović
   Dávid Király
   János Temesvári

Pivots
 10  Nebojša Simović
 89  Péter István
   Dániel Horváth

Back players
 5  Nikola Lazić
 8  Ádám Korsós
 17  Gábor Oláh
 24  Zoltán Morva
 33  Tarik Vranac
 44  Jozef Hanták
   Sándor Balázs

Staff members 
 Head Coach: 
  Assistant Coach: 
  Club Doctor: , MD
  Masseur:

Transfers
Transfers for the 2015–16 season

Joining
  Teodor Paul (from Tatabánya)
  Nebojša Simović (from Lovćen Cetinje)
  Marinko Kekezović (from Energia Târgu Jiu)
  Ákos Balda (from Nyíregyháza)
  Gábor Oláh (from Csurgó)
  Zoltán Morva (from Orosháza)
  Jozef Hanták (from KP Brno)
  István Bagi (from )
  Imre Veres (from )
  Dávid Király (from )

Leaving
  Richárd Bali (to Gyöngyös)
  Nikola Džono (to Zagłębie Lubin)
  Marko Ćuruvija (to Szeged)
  Tamás Oláh (to PLER)
  Igor Cagalj (to Maribor Branik)
  Marek Kovácech (to Union Leoben)
  Norbert Nagy (to FTC)
  Tamás Hajdu (to Dabas)
  Zoltán Oláh (to Nyíregyháza)
  Atsushi Mekaru (to Nyíregyháza)
  Nikola Knežević (to )
  Miloje Dolić (to )

Previous Squads

Honours

Recent seasons

Seasons in Nemzeti Bajnokság I: 3
Seasons in Nemzeti Bajnokság I/B: 7
Seasons in Nemzeti Bajnokság II: 22

Former club members

Notable former players

 Ákos Doros
 Péter Gúnya
 Dávid Katzirz
  Marinko Kekezović
 Gábor Oláh
 Tarik Vranac
 Andrei Vakhnovich
 Victor Joao Perez
 Nikola Džono
 Nikola Knežević
 Mateo Dioris
 Marc Jordan
 Miguel Angel Martinez
 Atsushi Mekaru
 Nebojša Simović
 Stevan Vujović
 Igor Cagalj
 Marko Ćuruvija (2014–2015, 2017-2018)
 Miloje Dolić
 Nikola Lazić
 Darko Pavlović
 Milan Rasic
 Aleksandar Stojanović
 Bojan Tomic
 Jozef Hanták
 Marek Kovácech
 Teodor Paul
 Nacor Medina Perez

References

External links
 

Hungarian handball clubs
Sport in Hajdú-Bihar County